The Russian Communist Workers' Party of the Communist Party of the Soviet Union (RCWP-CPSU; ; Rossiyskaya kommunisticheskaya rabochaya partiya v sostave Kommunisticheskoy partii Sovetskogo Soyuza, RKRP-KPSS) is an anti-revisionist Marxist–Leninist communist party in Russia. It is considered the republican branch of the Communist Party of the Soviet Union (2001).

The RCWP-CPSU is led by Viktor Tyulkin, who was co-chairman with Anatolii Kriuchkov until the latter died in 2005). It publishes a newspaper called Trudovaja Rossija (Working People's Russia) and the journal Sovetskij Sojuz (Soviet Union).

The RCWP-CPSU claims to have supported all the biggest occupations and strikes in Russia. It has links to the Russian trade union Zashchita. As of 2007, it claims about 50,000 members. The Revolutionary Communist Youth League (Bolshevik) (RCYL(B)), the youth organization of the RCWP-CPSU, is considered one of the most active communist youth organizations in Russia.

History 

The party was established in October 2001 under the name Russian Communist Workers' Party – Revolutionary Party of Communists (abbreviated) through the unification of the Russian Communist Workers' Party, the Russian Party of Communists and the Union of Communists with the aim of resurrecting socialism and the Soviet Union.

In the 1999 Duma election, the party won 2.2% of the total vote, getting 1,481,890 votes overall. The RCWP-CPSU considers the Communist Party of the Russian Federation (CPRF) to be reformist, but for the occasion of the 2003 Duma election the party leaders decided to make an agreement with the CPRF in order not to disperse the communist vote.

In 2007, the party was de-registered by the Justice Ministry. In 2010, the RCWP-CPSU co-founded Russian registered political party Russian United Labour Front (ROT Front), which is led by Viktor Tyulkin. In April 2012, the party took its current name.

During the protests following the 2020 Belarusian presidential election, RCWP called on the workers of Belarus not to allow the protests turn into a "Belarusian Maidan on the model of Kiev," referring to 2013-14 Euromaidan protests in Ukraine.

In 2021, Stepan Malentsov was elected the new First Secretary of the Central Committee of the Russian Communist Workers' Party (RCWP-CPSU) as it was decided at the XII (XXII) Congress that took place in Moscow.

The party supported the recognition of the Donetsk People's Republic and the Luhansk People's Republic by Russia, stating that it is a decision taken "much later than it should have been, but better late than never."

RCWP opposed the 2022 Russian invasion of Ukraine by announcing: "we have no doubts that the true aims of the Russian state in this war are quite imperialistic — to strengthen the position of imperialist Russia in world market competition..." and the party called for an end to "fratricidal conflicts."

References

External links
 

2001 establishments in Russia
Anti-revisionist organizations
Communist parties in Russia
Neo-Sovietism
Neo-Stalinist parties
Far-left politics in Russia
Formerly registered political parties in Russia
International Meeting of Communist and Workers Parties
Political parties established in 2001
Political organizations based in Russia